Vend may refer to:

 Vend (ethnonym), a German and Hungarian term for Slavs
 Vend (letter) in Old Norse
 Vends, a Balto-Finnic people from Livonia
 Vend (software), point-of-sale cloud provider from New Zealand

See also
 Vending
 Vendor